Vranić is a settlement in the Bosnia and Herzegovina, Republika Srpska entity, Kotor Varoš Municipality.

Population

See also
Kotor Varoš

References

Villages in Bosnia and Herzegovina
Kotor Varoš